In Roman mythology, Volturnus was a god of the Tiber, and may have been the god of all rivers. He had his own minor flamen, a high priest, the Flamen Volturnalis. His festival, Volturnalia, was held on August 27.

Culture
Although he was originally an Etruscan god, his worship spread to Rome, and appears to have replaced or coincided with the Roman god Tiber.

History
Although originally popular enough to receive his own Flamen, he vanished into obscurity around the time of the late Roman Republic.

Appearance
Volturnus was a man, who had long blonde hair.

Family
Volturnus had at least two descendants, a daughter named Juturna, a grandchild named Fons. Fons was born of a love affair between Juturna and Janus, and was the god of spring water.

Honours
Volturnus Lake in Antarctica is named after the deity.

References

Roman gods
Sea and river gods
Personifications of rivers